Huasheng Morning Post (华声晨报; 華聲晨報), or Huasheng Chenbao, also transliterated as Huasheng Morning News, is a Nanning-based Chinese morning newspaper that is publicly issued to China and abroad.

Huasheng Morning Post also has two weekly digests, namely Huasheng Morning Post - World Reference and Huasheng Morning Post - World Column.

History
Huasheng Morning Post, founded in 1956, was sponsored and supervised by Overseas Exchange Association of Guangxi Zhuang Autonomous Region.

References

Publications established in 1956
Daily newspapers published in China